Michael Lewis Webster (March 18, 1952September 24, 2002) was an American professional football player who was a center in the National Football League (NFL) from 1974 to 1990 with the Pittsburgh Steelers and Kansas City Chiefs. He is a member of the Pro Football Hall of Fame, class of 1997. Nicknamed "Iron Mike", Webster anchored the Steelers' offensive line during much of their run of four Super Bowl victories from 1974 to 1979 and is considered by many the greatest center in NFL history.

Webster died in 2002 at the age of 50 of a heart attack, and subsequently was the first former NFL player diagnosed with chronic traumatic encephalopathy (CTE). Since his death, he has become a symbol for head injuries in the NFL and the ongoing debate over player safety. His doctors were of the opinion that multiple concussions during his career damaged his frontal lobe, which caused cognitive dysfunction.

Early life 
Webster was born in Tomahawk, Wisconsin on March 18, 1952 as the second child of six children. Webster grew up on a 640-acre potato farm near Harshaw, Wisconsin. As a child, Webster idolized Green Bay Packers fullback Jim Taylor. Webster attended Rhinelander High School, where he earned accolades in wrestling. Due to Webster's responsibilities on his family's farm, he did not start playing football until his junior year. Despite Webster's late introduction to the game, he quickly learned how to command the offensive line and earned a football scholarship. Following his graduation in 1969, Webster committed to the University of Wisconsin–Madison.

Career

University of Wisconsin
Webster was regarded as the best center in the Big Ten during most of his career at the University of Wisconsin–Madison.

Pittsburgh Steelers
At 6-foot-1, 255 pounds, he was drafted in the fifth round of the 1974 NFL Draft by the Pittsburgh Steelers. Serving as a backup at center and guard for two years while being mentored by veteran center Ray Mansfield, Webster became the team's starting center in 1976, where he remained for 150 consecutive games. He was the Steelers' offensive captain for nine years.This ended in 1986 when he dislocated his elbow, causing him to sit out for four games. With the Steelers winning Super Bowl IX, X, XIII, and XIV, Webster and Terry Bradshaw form one of the best-known center–quarterback pairs in history. Webster was honored as an All-Pro seven times and played in the Pro Bowl nine times. 

An avid weightlifter, Webster was known for playing with bare arms to keep opponents from grabbing his sleeves.  Webster is also perhaps the best known of a long line of All-Pro centers for the Steelers. From 1964 to 2020, just five men started at that position:  Mansfield, Webster, Dermontti Dawson, Jeff Hartings, and Maurkice Pouncey, with the only exceptions being injuries as well as a three year period between 2007 and 2009 when the center position alternated between journeymen Sean Mahan and Justin Hartwig. In his last year in Pittsburgh, Webster returned the favor by mentoring the then-rookie Dawson in the same manner Mansfield had mentored Webster earlier in his career.

Kansas City Chiefs
Webster became a free agent following the 1988 season. He was signed by the Kansas City Chiefs, who initially made him an offensive line coach before allowing him to return as the starting center.

Retirement and legacy
Webster played two seasons in Kansas City before announcing his retirement on March 11, 1991, after a 17-year career with a total of 245 games played at center. 

At the time of his retirement, he was the last active player in the NFL to have played on all four Super Bowl winning teams of the 1970s Steelers. At the time of his retirement, he had played more seasons as a Steeler than anyone else in franchise history (15 seasons), one season ahead of Terry Bradshaw and Hines Ward. Ben Roethlisberger tied Webster's record in the 2018 season, and broke it in 2019 

While the Steelers were no longer officially retiring jersey numbers at the time of his retirement, Webster's No. 52 has not been reissued by the team since he retired in deference to his legacy with the Steelers. In 1999, he was ranked number 75 on The Sporting News''' list of the 100 Greatest Football Players. The football stadium at Rhinelander High School, his alma mater, is named Mike Webster Stadium in his honor. Webster was posthumously elected to the Wisconsin Athletic Hall of Fame in 2007.

 Post-football life 
Webster was proven to have been disabled before retiring from the NFL. After retirement, Webster had amnesia, dementia, depression, and acute bone and muscular pain. He lived out of his pickup truck or in train stations between Wisconsin and Pittsburgh, even though his friends and former teammates offered to rent apartments for him. Teammate Terry Bradshaw regularly covered expenses for Webster and his family, while Steelers owner Dan Rooney paid for a hotel room for Webster for over three months. Nonetheless, Webster continued to disappear for weeks at a time without explanation and without contact with friends and family. He exhibited unusual changes in behavior, and became so agitated and restless that he used electroshock weapons on himself to induce sleep.

In his last years Webster lived with his youngest son, Garrett, who though only a teenager at the time, moved from Wisconsin to Pittsburgh to care for his father. Webster's wife Pamela divorced him six months before his death in 2002 of a heart attack at age 50.Frank Litsky. "Mike Webster, 50, Dies; Troubled Football Hall of Famer ". The New York Times, September 25, 2002. Accessed December 26, 2015.

Webster was cremated and his ashes were returned to his wife and their four children.

 Illness 
After death, Webster was diagnosed with chronic traumatic encephalopathy (CTE), a neurodegenerative disease. Webster was the first former NFL player diagnosed with CTE. Dr. Bennet Omalu, a forensic neuropathologist, examined tissue from Webster and eight other NFL players and determined they all showed the kind of brain damage previously seen in people with Alzheimer's disease or dementia, as well as in some retired boxers. Webster's brain resembled those of boxers with "dementia pugilistica", also known as "punch-drunk syndrome". Omalu's findings were largely ignored by the NFL until Cincinnati Bengals wide receiver Chris Henry was diagnosed with CTE shortly after his death at age 26 in 2009. Webster's son Garrett now serves as the administrator to the Brain Injury Research Institute in Pittsburgh, which is dedicated to encouraging individuals who have had head trauma to donate their brains after death as well as being an advocate to players who have similar conditions that his father had.

It has been speculated that Webster's ailments were due to wear and tear sustained over his playing career; some doctors estimated he had been in the equivalent of "25,000 automobile crashes" in over 25 years of playing football at the high school, college and professional levels. His wife Pamela stated years later that she felt that she caused Webster's change in personality in the years before his death and placed guilt on herself over her decision to divorce Webster, until discovering after his death about the CTE diagnosis. Webster played during an era when protective equipment (especially helmets) was inferior, and head injuries were simply considered part of the game.

At the time of his death, Webster was addicted to prescription medication. 

Nicknamed "Iron Mike", Webster's reputation for durability led him to play even through injuries. Contrary to rumors, Webster never admitted to using anabolic steroids during his career, even though they were legal at the time.

His struggle with mental illness, as a result of CTE, at the end of his life was depicted in the 2015 film Concussion''. Webster was portrayed by David Morse and Dr. Bennet Omalu was portrayed by Will Smith.

Lawsuit 
Webster's estate brought a lawsuit in Maryland's United States District Court against the National Football League. The estate contended that Webster was disabled at the time of his retirement, and was owed $1.142 million in disability payments under the NFL's retirement plan. On April 26, 2005, a federal judge ruled that the NFL benefits plan owed Webster's estate $1.18 million in benefits. With the addition of interest and fees, that amount was estimated to exceed $1.60 million. The NFL appealed the ruling. On December 13, 2006, the U.S. Court of Appeals for the Fourth Circuit in Richmond, Virginia, upheld the Baltimore federal judge's 2005 ruling that the league's retirement plan must pay benefits reserved for players whose disabilities began while they were still playing football.

References

External links
 

1952 births
2002 deaths
American football centers
American football long snappers
Kansas City Chiefs players
Pittsburgh Steelers players
Wisconsin Badgers football players
American Conference Pro Bowl players
American football players with chronic traumatic encephalopathy
Pro Football Hall of Fame inductees
People from Rhinelander, Wisconsin
People from Tomahawk, Wisconsin
Players of American football from Wisconsin